The Gambling Den of Montmartre (German: Die Hölle von Montmartre) is a 1928 German silent film directed by Willy Reiber and Franz Seitz and starring Eric Barclay, Suzy Vernon and Maurice de Féraudy.

The film's sets were designed by the art director Ludwig Reiber. It was made at the Emelka Studios in Munich.

Cast
 Eric Barclay as Der Straßenspieler  
 Suzy Vernon as Suzy  
 Maurice de Féraudy as Der alte Sonderling  
 Carmen Cartellieri as Die Zimmervermieterin  
 Max Weydner as Der Kellner  
 Hans Bauer as Der Einbrecher 
 Otto Wernicke as Der Apache 
 Hermi Lutz as Der Pikkolo

References

Bibliography
 Bock, Hans-Michael & Bergfelder, Tim. The Concise CineGraph. Encyclopedia of German Cinema. Berghahn Books, 2009.

External links

1928 films
Films of the Weimar Republic
Films directed by Franz Seitz
Films directed by Willy Reiber
German silent feature films
Films set in Paris
Bavaria Film films
German black-and-white films
Films shot at Bavaria Studios